Paskar Owor (born 22 December 1980, in Nagongera) is a Ugandan retired middle-distance runner who specialised in the 800 metres. He represented his country at the 2000 and 2004 Summer Olympics without qualifying for the semifinals. He won the bronze medal in the event at the 1998 World Junior Championships.

Competition record

Personal bests

Outdoor
800 metres – 1:46.37 (Strasbourg 2004)
1500 metres – 3:40.60 (2006)

Indoor
800 metres – 1:47.58 (Saarbrücken 2002)

References

1980 births
Living people
Ugandan male middle-distance runners
Athletes (track and field) at the 2000 Summer Olympics
Athletes (track and field) at the 2004 Summer Olympics
Olympic athletes of Uganda
Athletes (track and field) at the 1998 Commonwealth Games
Athletes (track and field) at the 2002 Commonwealth Games
Commonwealth Games competitors for Uganda
People from Tororo District
Athletes (track and field) at the 1999 All-Africa Games
Athletes (track and field) at the 2003 All-Africa Games
African Games competitors for Uganda